Bogumiła Matusiak (born 24 January 1971 in Pabianice) is a road cyclist from Poland. She is 25 times Polish champion. She represented her nation at UCI Road World Championships between 1994 and 2008 about every year.

References

External links
profile at Procyclingstats.com

1971 births
Living people
Polish female cyclists
Cyclists at the 2004 Summer Olympics
Olympic cyclists of Poland
People from Pabianice
Sportspeople from Łódź Voivodeship
21st-century Polish women